Rotomusic de Liquidificapum is the first album of the Brazilian rock band Pato Fu. It was released in 1993.

Tracks

Personnel 
 Fernanda Takai -  vocals (lead on "O Processo da Criação" and "O Amor em Carne e Osso")
 John Ulhoa - vocals, lead guitar; programming (Roland MC50)
 Ricardo Koctus - bass guitar, vocals

Pato Fu albums
1993 debut albums